There are over 20,000 Grade II* listed buildings in England. This page is a list of these buildings in the district of Teignbridge in Devon.

Teignbridge

|}

Notes

References

External links

Lists of Grade II* listed buildings in Devon
Teignbridge